Ocotea robertsoniae is a species of evergreen tree in the plant genus Ocotea of the family Lauraceae. It is endemic to Jamaica.

References

robertsoniae
Endemic flora of Jamaica
Trees of Jamaica
Taxonomy articles created by Polbot